The Canadian Dominion Football Championship was awarded to the best amateur football team prior to the Grey Cup in 1909. Teams from the Ontario Rugby Football Union, Quebec Rugby Football Union, Interprovincial Rugby Football Union and the Canadian Intercollegiate Rugby Football Union would compete for the championship.

Championship games

References

 http://www.cflapedia.com/
 https://web.archive.org/web/20110727185339/http://www.profootballresearchers.org/Coffin_Corner/07-An-245.pdf
 https://web.archive.org/web/20121022100332/http://www.profootballresearchers.org/Coffin_Corner/23-01-876.pdf
 https://web.archive.org/web/20121022100101/http://www.profootballresearchers.org/Coffin_Corner/23-02-885.pdf
 https://web.archive.org/web/20121022100345/http://www.profootballresearchers.org/Coffin_Corner/23-04-900.pdf
 https://web.archive.org/web/20121022100349/http://www.profootballresearchers.org/Coffin_Corner/23-05-908.pdf
 https://web.archive.org/web/20101218180627/http://profootballresearchers.org/Coffin_Corner/23-06-916.pdf
 https://web.archive.org/web/20101218193052/http://profootballresearchers.org/Coffin_Corner/24-01-919.pdf

Rugby union competitions in Canada
Canadian football competitions